Jarnail Singh (born 15 March 1981) is an Aam Aadmi Party(AAP) politician. He was elected to the Fifth Legislative Assembly of Delhi in 2013, in 2015 for Sixth Legislative Assembly of Delhi and in 2020 for Seventh Legislative Assembly of Delhi. He is three times representative for Tilak Nagar constituency.

Personal life

Jarnail Singh was born on 15 March 1981 in Rampur. He was brought up in Delhi by his father, Harbajan Singh who was a farmer, now a businessman and mother Surjit Kaur.
Jarnail Singh completed his education till 12th grade. In the year 2006, he became the General Secretary of Water Purification and treatment equipment manufacturer association (WAPTEMA).
In 2010, he married Sukhjeet Kaur.
Currently, he is positioned as the Chairman of WAPTEMA.

Career

Politics

Punjab Elections 2022
Jarnail Singh was appointed the in-charge of AAP Punjab unit ahead of the 2022 Punjab Assembly elections.

Delhi Elections
In December 2013, the newly formed Aam Aadmi Party contested elections for the first time and thereby Jarnail Singh won the elections and became the “Youngest Sikh MLA” of Delhi Legislative Assembly. He defeated Rajiv Babbar, the son of 3-time MLA OP Babbar, by over 2000 votes.
In the same year, Jarnail was elected as the chairman of the District Development Committee.
The AAP minority government dissolved 49 days after the 2013 elections and a period of President's Rule commenced. In 2014, he was appointed the first President of AAP youth wing.

At the subsequent elections in February 2015 and 2020, Singh was again elected as MLA for Tilak Nagar.

Activism
In 2011, Anna Hazare launched the Jan Lokpal movement. Jarnail Singh was involved in this movement.

Member of Legislative Assembly (2020 - present)
Since 2020, he is an elected member of the 7th Delhi Assembly .

Committee assignments of Delhi Legislative Assembly
 Chairperson (2022-2023), Committee on Government Undertakings

Electoral performance

References

External links
 Affidavit

1981 births
Living people
People from Rampur, Uttar Pradesh
Delhi MLAs 2013–2015
Delhi MLAs 2015–2020
Delhi MLAs 2020–2025
Aam Aadmi Party MLAs from Delhi